Major General Ralph Holley Keefler,  (September 12, 1902 – September 17, 1983) was a Canadian soldier and businessman. He was commander of the 3rd Canadian Infantry Division during World War II and was chairman and president of Northern Electric (now Nortel Networks).

Born in Weston, Ontario, the son of Joseph Keefler and Margaret Isabel Holley, he received a B.A.Sc. in Mechanical Engineering from the University of Toronto in 1924 and later joined the Bell Telephone Company. During World War II, he was the Major-General in command of the 3rd Canadian Infantry Division.

After the war, he became chairman and president of Northern Electric. In 1965 he was president of the Canadian Chamber of Commerce.

See also
 John Roth

External links
 
Generals of World War II

References

|-

1902 births
1983 deaths
Businesspeople from Toronto
Canadian Companions of the Distinguished Service Order
Canadian Commanders of the Order of the British Empire
People from Weston, Toronto
Military personnel from Toronto
Canadian generals
University of Toronto alumni
Nortel employees
Directors of Nortel
Canadian Army generals of World War II